Six referendums were held in Switzerland in 1979. The first four were held on 18 February on reducing the voting age to 18 (rejected), a popular initiative "for the promotion of footpaths and hiking trails" (approved), "against advertising for addictive drugs" (rejected) and "for ensuring people's rights and the security of nuclear power installations" (rejected).

The last two were held on 20 May on reforms to sales and direct federal taxation (rejected) and a federal resolution on the nuclear power law (approved).

Results

February: Reducing the voting age to 18

February: Popular initiative on footpaths and hiking trails

February: Popular initiative against advertising addictive drugs

February: Popular initiative on people's rights and nuclear power installations

May: Changes to sales and direct federal taxation

May: Nuclear power law

References

1979 referendums
1979 in Switzerland
Referendums in Switzerland